Saint-Pierre-de-Clages is a village in Switzerland. It is located in the French-speaking part of the Canton of Valais in the municipality of Chamoson.

The village of Saint-Pierre-de-Clages was joined with the municipality of Chamoson in 1376. It is famous for its 11th-century church with its octagonal bell tower.

The village of Saint-Pierre-de-Clages is also known as the Swiss book town with an annual book festival.

References

External links 
Le Village du livre

Villages in Valais